James Arthur Edward Eggleton (29 August 1897 – 13 January 1963) was an English professional football centre half, best remembered for his long association with Queens Park Rangers. He served the club as a player, trainer, reserve team manager and odd-job man manager for 37 years. He also played for Football League clubs Watford and Charlton Athletic.

Personal life 
Eggleton served as a gunner in the Royal Artillery during the First World War and was gassed during the course of his service.

Career statistics

References 

English footballers
English Football League players
1897 births
1963 deaths
People from Heston
Footballers from Hounslow
British Army personnel of World War I
Royal Artillery soldiers
Association football wing halves
Slough Town F.C. players
Charlton Athletic F.C. players
Watford F.C. players
Lincoln City F.C. players
Queens Park Rangers F.C. players
Queens Park Rangers F.C. non-playing staff